Fujian Agriculture and Forestry University  (FAFU) is a leading higher education institution in Fujian Province, jointly supported by the Ministry of Agriculture, the State Forestry Administration and the Fujian Provincial Government in China. Rated “Grade A” on the Undergraduate Teaching Evaluation by the State Ministry of Education, FAFU is one of the first-batch universities to grant master's degrees and one of the second-batch universities to confer doctoral degrees in China. It is also one of the higher education institutions with Chinese Government Scholarship Programs to sponsor international students. The school has witnessed 78 years of development. There are also two independent colleges, Jinshan College and Dongfang College, affiliated to FAFU, with a total enrollment of 30,000 students.

Introduction
Fujian Agriculture and Forestry University (FAFU) is a major higher education institution in Fujian province with a 76-year history. Its history can be traced back to the Agricultural Department of Fukien Christian College founded in 1936 and Fujian Provincial Agriculture College founded in 1940. The university was renamed to FAFU after the merger of Fujian Forestry College and Fujian Agriculture University in 2000.
FAFU is located in Fuzhou, the capital city of Fujian Province on the seashore of the Pacific Ocean with picturesque scenery and rich history and culture. With its beautiful, environmentally-friendly campus, the university has been honored as one of China's model organizations of spiritual civilization, one of China's model “green” employers and one of China's most employee-friendly organizations. FAFU employs over 2300 faculty and staff among which there are more than 1600 full-time faculty members including 800 full or associate professors/investigators. FAFU contains 23 colleges, 72 undergraduate majors covering ten subject areas in science, engineering, agriculture, economics, management, humanities, law, medicine, etc. The university has a total enrollment of over 24,000 full-time undergraduate students and around 4,000 graduate students. There are eight post-doctoral research centers and offers eleven first-rate doctoral programs, 23 first-rate master's programs, and seven professional master's degree programs. In addition, FAFU has established a national science and biology center, a national key academic program and a training center.

History
The university was founded in 1936. It is now known as the Fujian Agriculture and Forestry University and is a public university focused on the development of agriculture and forestry.

Campus 
The main campus is in the Cangshan District of Fuzhou and most of the institutions are located here. There is another small campus located in Minhou, called Qishan Campus. This university also owns a campus in Quanzhou City, named Anxi College of Tea Science. Apart from its major campuses, the university owns and operates two independent colleges, named Oriental College and Jinshan College. The Oriental College has changed its name as “Fuzhou Technology and Business College” and detached from the operating system of FAFU in 2019.

Academic Success
FAFU has won 655 science and technology awards and outstanding social achievement awards at the national and provincial level since 1978. As the first organization to initiate JUNCAO technology, a hybridized elephant grass biomass substrate, FAFU has been offering high-level international training classes of JUNCAO technology for 50 rounds with more than 1662 trainees. To date, JUNCAO technology has been introduced to 87 countries in five continents. Being hailed as a unique and niche major in China, the faculty of Bee Science in FAFU has become the most important talent base and resource for professional training and technological innovation in the field. FAFU is also one of the pioneering universities in China to offer Tea Science major. Distinctive research programs in the field of specialized teas including the oolong tea have been established here, which provide a comprehensive and unique education and research opportunities for undergraduate and graduate studies.

Hot Program
Environmental engineering, chemical engineering and Technology, seed science and engineering, Agriculture Biotechnology, Cytobiology, Genetics, Tea Science, Microbiology

International Effort
In recent years FAFU has stepped up its efforts in becoming an internationally recognized institution of higher education. It is entitled to the Chinese Government Scholarship Program, and has established the world's second Confucius Institute featuring agriculture in Durban, South Africa. The university has built friendships with over 50 research institutes in more than 20 countries and regions. Together with Dalhousie University and University of British Columbia, FAFU has established two undergraduate education programs in Horticulture and Resource and Environmental Science and one in Ecology, respectively; In addition, over the years the university has welcomed a large number of overseas students from 30 countries such as the US, Canada, Sudan, and Thailand, etc., and the heads of states from Papua New Guinea, Guyana, Cambodia, and South Africa have successively visited FAFU.

College Student Innovation Program
FAFU so far has set up 160 national experimental or training programs to improve students’ innovative abilities, and won 443 provincial or higher awards in college student innovation competitions. FAFU leads other Fujian-based universities especially in the branch of extra-curriculum scientific activities of the National College Student Challenger Cup of Science & Technology competition. Among students in provincial universities, FAFU students have received the most funding from provincial or higher organizations for their innovative programs for two consecutive years.

References

External links 

 "Official Website"

Universities and colleges in Fujian
Agricultural universities and colleges in China
Forestry education
Educational institutions established in 1936
1936 establishments in China
Forestry in China